Civic technology is technology that enables engagement and participation, or enhances the relationship between the people and government, by enhancing citizen communications and public decision, improving government delivery of services and infrastructure. This comparison of civic technology platforms compares platforms that are designed to improve citizen participation in governance, distinguished from technology that directly deals with government infrastructure.

Platform types 

Graham Smith of the University of Southampton, in his book Beyond the Ballot, used the following categorization of democratic innovations:

 Electoral innovations"aim to increase electoral turnout"
 Consultation innovations"aim to inform decision-makers of citizens' views" 
 Deliberative innovations"aim to bring citizens together to deliberate on policy issues, the outcomes of which may influence decision-makers"
 Co-governance innovations"aim to give citizens significant influence during the process of decision-making" 
 Direct democracy innovations"aim to give citizens final decision-making power on key issues" 
 E-democracy innovations"use information technology to engage citizens in the decision-making process"

Comparison chart

See also 
 Civic technology
 Civic technology companies
 Comparison of Internet forum software
 Comparison of Q&A sites
 E-democracy
 Liquid democracy
 Open government
 Voting
 Direct democracy

References 

Political software
Open government
Voting
Direct democracy
Civic technology platforms